Kayron Batista Ramos (born 3 April 1995), commonly known as Kayron, is a Brazilian footballer who plays as a forward for Avenida.

Career statistics

Club

Notes

References

1995 births
Living people
Brazilian footballers
Brazilian expatriate footballers
Association football forwards
Esporte Clube Pelotas players
Esporte Clube Juventude players
Concórdia Atlético Clube players
Veranópolis Esporte Clube Recreativo e Cultural players
Mirassol Futebol Clube players
Esporte Clube Cruzeiro players
Barra Futebol Clube players
FC Ararat-Armenia players
Esporte Clube Avenida players
Campeonato Brasileiro Série C players
Campeonato Brasileiro Série D players
Armenian Premier League players
Brazilian expatriate sportspeople in Armenia
Expatriate footballers in Armenia